Marie Anne Isler Béguin (born 30 June 1956 in Boulay-Moselle) is a French politician and Member of the European Parliament for the East of France. She is a member of the French Greens, part of the European Greens. She was re-elected in 2004. She sits on the Committee on the Environment, Public Health and Food Safety and is a substitute for the Committee on Foreign Affairs. She also is the Chairwoman of the delegation of the European parliament to Armenia, Azerbaijan, and Georgia.

External links
 
 

1956 births
Living people
People from Boulay-Moselle
The Greens (France) MEPs
MEPs for France 1999–2004
MEPs for East France 2004–2009
20th-century women MEPs for France
21st-century women MEPs for France